Dorothy Savile, Viscountess Halifax (née Spencer; 1640 – 16 December 1670) was the first wife of George Savile, 1st Viscount Halifax, and the mother of the 2nd Marquess.

Dorothy was the daughter of Henry Spencer, 1st Earl of Sunderland, and his wife, the former Lady Dorothy Sidney (or Sydney).

Lady Dorothy married George Savile on 29 December 1656, at St Giles in the Fields in London. They had two children:
William Savile, 2nd Marquess of Halifax
Anne Savile, later Countess of Carbery (c.1663-1690)

In 1667, George Savile was created Viscount Halifax. Following his wife's death, he remarried, in 1672, his second wife being Gertrude Pierrepont, daughter of William Pierrepont of Thoresby. His elevation to the title of Marquess of Halifax came in 1682, some years after Dorothy's death.

References

1640 births
1670 deaths
English viscountesses
Daughters of British earls
Dorothy
17th-century English women